Burkette is a surname. Notable people with the surname include:

David Burkette, American politician
Bill Burkette, member of The Vogues

See also
Burnette